Brigita Partikaitė (born 17 May 1991) is a Lithuanian former footballer who played as a defender. She has been a member of the Lithuania women's national team.

References

1991 births
Living people
Women's association football defenders
Lithuanian women's footballers
Lithuania women's international footballers
Gintra Universitetas players